Joseph F. Sage (August 24, 1920 – January 9, 1977) was an American politician. He served as a Republican member of the Texas House of Representatives.

Sage attended Pottsville High School, Trinity University, Saint Louis University and Drake University. Sage worked as a lawyer. He served in the United States Army Air Force for 30 years, including service in World War II and the Korean War, retiring with the rank of colonel. In 1973 Sage was elected to the Texas House of Representatives, serving until 1975.

Sage died in January 1977, at the age of 56. He was buried in Fort Sam Houston National Cemetery.

References 

1920 births
1977 deaths
Republican Party members of the Texas House of Representatives
Texas lawyers
20th-century American politicians
Burials at Fort Sam Houston National Cemetery
Trinity University (Texas) alumni
Saint Louis University alumni
Drake University alumni